This is a list of colleges and universities in Nagaland, India, pointing to their articles.

Universities 
 Nagaland University
 North East Christian University, Medziphema
 ICFAI University, Chümoukedima
 St. Joseph University, Chümoukedima
 The Global Open University, Chümoukedima

Arts, Science & Commerce Colleges

Chümoukedima District 
 C-Edge College
 Mount Mary College
 Patkai Christian College
 Tetso College

Dimapur District 
 City College, Dimapur
 Cornerstone College, Dimapur
 Dimapur Government College
 Eastern Christian College, Dimapur
 Unity College, Dimapur
 Immanuel College, Dimapur
 Sakus Mission College
 SALT College, Dimapur
 St. John College, Dimapur
 S.D. Jain Girl's College
 Pranabananda Women's College

Kohima District 
 Alder College
 Baptist College
 Kohima College
 Japfü Christian College
 Kohima Science College
 KROS College
 Model Christian College
 Modern College
 Mount Olive College
 Oriental College
 Sazolie College
 St. Joseph's College, Jakhama

Mokokchung District 
 Fazl Ali College
 Tuli College

Mon District 
 Wangkhao Government College

Peren District 
 Peren Government College
 St. Xavier College, Jalukie

Tuensang District 
 Sao Chang College, Tuensang

Wokha District 
 Mount Tiyi Government College

Zünheboto District 
 Zünheboto Government College

Law Colleges
 City Law College, Dimapur
 Kohima Law College
 Mokokchung Law College, Mokokchung

Social Science Colleges
 North East Institute of Social Sciences, NEISSR Dimapur

See also 
 Lists of universities and colleges

References 

Universities and colleges in Nagaland
Nagaland
Education